Applied linguistics is an interdisciplinary field which identifies, investigates, and offers solutions to language-related real-life problems. Some of the academic fields related to applied linguistics are education, psychology, communication research, information science, natural language processing, anthropology, and sociology.

Domain 
Applied linguistics is an interdisciplinary field. Major branches of applied linguistics include bilingualism and multilingualism, conversation analysis, contrastive linguistics, language assessment, literacies, discourse analysis, language pedagogy, second language acquisition, language planning and policy, interlinguistics, stylistics, language teacher education, forensic linguistics, and translation.

Journals 

Major journals of the field include Research Methods in Applied Linguistics, Annual Review of Applied Linguistics, Applied Linguistics, Studies in Second Language Acquisition, Applied Psycholinguistics, International Review of Applied Linguistics in Language Teaching, International Journal of Applied Linguistics, Applied Linguistics Review, European Journal of Applied Linguistics, Language Learning, Language and Education, System, TESOL Quarterly, International Journal of Language Studies, and Linguistics and Education.

History 
The tradition of applied linguistics established itself in part as a response to the narrowing of focus in linguistics with the advent in the late 1950s of generative linguistics, and has always maintained a socially-accountable role, demonstrated by its central interest in language problems.

Although the field of applied linguistics started in Europe and the United States, the field rapidly flourished in the international context.

Applied linguistics first concerned itself with principles and practices on the basis of linguistics. In the early days, applied linguistics was thought as "linguistics-applied" at least from the outside of the field. In the 1960s, however, applied linguistics was expanded to include language assessment, language policy, and second language acquisition. As early as the 1970s, applied linguistics became a problem-driven field rather than theoretical linguistics, including the solution of language-related problems in the real world. By the 1990s, applied linguistics had broadened including critical studies and multilingualism. Research in applied linguistics was shifted to  "the theoretical and empirical investigation of real-world problems in which language is a central issue."

In the United States, applied linguistics also began narrowly as the application of insights from structural linguistics—first to the teaching of English in schools and subsequently to second and foreign language teaching. The linguistics applied approach to language teaching was promulgated most strenuously by Leonard Bloomfield, who developed the foundation for the Army Specialized Training Program, and by Charles C. Fries, who established the English Language Institute (ELI) at the University of Michigan in 1941. In 1946, Applied linguistics became a recognized field of study at the aforementioned university. In 1948, the Research Club at Michigan established Language Learning: A Journal of Applied Linguistics, the first journal to bear the term applied linguistics. In the late 1960s, applied linguistics began to establish its own identity as an interdisciplinary field of linguistics concerned with real-world language issues. The new identity was solidified by the creation of the American Association for Applied Linguistics in 1977.

Associations 
The International Association of Applied Linguistics was founded in France in 1964, where it is better known as Association Internationale de Linguistique Appliquée or AILA. AILA has affiliates in more than thirty countries, some of which are listed below.

Australia 
Australian applied linguistics took as its target the applied linguistics of mother tongue teaching and teaching English to immigrants. The Australian tradition shows a strong influence of continental Europe and of the US, rather than of Britain. Applied Linguistics Association of Australia (ALAA) was established at a national congress of applied linguists held in August 1976. ALAA holds a joint annual conference in collaboration with the Association for Applied Linguistics in New Zealand (ALANZ).

Canada 
The Canadian Association of Applied Linguistics / L'Association Canadienne de Linguistique appliquée (CAAL/ACLA), is an officially bilingual (English and French) scholarly association with approximately 200 members. They produce the Canadian Journal of Applied Linguistics and hold an annual conference.

Ireland 
The Irish Association for Applied Linguistics/Cumann na Teangeolaíochta Feidhmí (IRAAL) was founded in 1975. They produce the journal Teanga, the Irish word for 'language'.

Japan 
In 1982, the Japan Association of Applied Linguistics (JAAL) was established in the Japan Association of College English Teachers (JACET) in order to engage in activities on a more international scale. In 1984, JAAL became an affiliate of the International Association of Applied Linguistics (AILA).

New Zealand 
The Applied Linguistics Association of New Zealand (ALANZ) produces the journal New Zealand Studies in Applied Linguistics and has been collaborating with the Applied Linguistics Association of Australia in a combined annual conference since 2010, with the Association for Language Testing and Assessment of Australia and New Zealand (ALTAANZ) later joining the now three-way conference collaboration.

South Africa 
The Southern African Applied Linguistics Association (SAALA) was founded in 1980. There are currently four publications associated with SAALA including the Southern African Linguistics and Applied Language Studies Journal (SAJALS).

United Kingdom 
The British Association for Applied Linguistics (BAAL) was established in 1967. Its mission is "the advancement of education by fostering and promoting, by any lawful charitable means, the study of language use, language acquisition and language teaching and the fostering of interdisciplinary collaboration in this study [...]". BAAL hosts an annual conference, as well as many additional smaller conferences and events organised by its Special Interest Groups (SIGs).

United States 
The American Association for Applied Linguistics (AAAL) was founded in 1977. AAAL holds an annual conference, usually in March or April, in the United States or Canada.

References

Further reading 
 Berns, M., & Matsuda, P. K. (2006). Applied linguistics: Overview and history. In K. Brown (Ed.), The Encyclopedia of language and linguistics (2nd ed.; pp. 394–405). Oxford, UK: Elsevier.
 Cook, G. (2003) Applied Linguistics (in the series Oxford Introduction to Language Study), Oxford: Oxford University Press.
 Davies, A. & Elder, C. (eds.) (2004) Handbook of Applied Linguistics, Oxford/Malden, MA:  Blackwell.
 Hall, C. J., Smith, P. H. & Wicaksono, R. (2017). Mapping Applied Linguistics. A Guide for Students and Practitioners. (2nd ed.) London: Routledge.
 Spolsky, B., & Hult, F.M. (Eds.). (2008). Handbook of Educational Linguistics. Malden, MA: Blackwell.
 Johnson, Keith & Johnson, Helen (1999) Encyclopedic Dictionary of Applied Linguistics, Oxford/Malden, MA: Blackwell.
 McCarthy, Michael (2001) Issues in Applied Linguistics, Cambridge University Press.
 Pennycook, Alastair (2001) Critical Applied Linguistics: A Critical Introduction, London: Lawrence Erlbaum Associates.
 Schmitt, Norbert (2002) An Introduction to Applied Linguistics, London: Arnold.
Wei, L. (Ed.). (2011). The Routledge Applied Linguistics Reader. New York: Routledge.

External links

Applied Linguistics information and resources (USA and Canada)
Center for Applied Linguistics
Language Academia
Linguistic Society of America

 
Rhetoric